The Selangor Symphonic Orchestra (SSO) is a professional orchestra based in Selangor, Malaysia. SSO consists of around 50 contracted musicians and with majority of the musicians being Malaysians. The orchestra's founder and inaugural music director is conductor Eugene Pook. The SSO's youth orchestra, the Selangor Symphony Youth Orchestra (SSYO), offers weekly orchestra training programs for young musicians.

History 
The SSO was founded in 2015 by Pook to create a platform for local professional classical musicians to thrive in, and to promote the expansion of Malaysian classical music. The SSO was launched by its past royal patron Tengku Zatashah, Princess of Selangor, who aided the orchestra's funds through the Make-A-Wish Malaysia campaign at 2015.

The orchestra's inaugural concert took place at the Jubli Perak Auditorium, SUK Negeri Selangor on 21 November 2015, and featured violin soloist Zhang Le.

Concerts and repertoire 
Since its establishment, SSO has performed a total of 12 concerts, from a small 4-piece string quartet to a 50-piece full orchestra. Currently, all of the SSO concerts were held in various venues in Klang Valley. All music is selected by their music director and conductors. The orchestra's annual season calendar consists of full orchestra concerts, series of chamber music events, and programs for education and outreach.

References

External links
  

Symphony orchestras
Organisations based in Selangor
Malaysian orchestras
2015 establishments in Malaysia
Musical groups established in 2015